Fusconaia askewi is a species of bivalve in the family Unionidae. It is endemic to the United States.

References

Molluscs of the United States
askewi
Molluscs described in 1896
Taxonomy articles created by Polbot